Volodymyr Zyuskov (born 29 August 1981) is a male long jumper from Ukraine. His personal best jump is 8.31 metres, achieved in July 2005 in Kyiv.

Competition record

External links

1981 births
Living people
Ukrainian male long jumpers
Athletes (track and field) at the 2004 Summer Olympics
Olympic athletes of Ukraine
Universiade medalists in athletics (track and field)
Universiade gold medalists for Ukraine